Garisan is a mountain in Gyeonggi-do, South Korea. Its sits on the boundary between the city of Pocheon and the county of Gapyeong.

See also
 List of mountains in Korea

Notes

References 
 

Mountains of Gyeonggi Province
Pocheon
Mountains of South Korea